Aureate Gloom is the thirteenth studio album by indie rock band of Montreal. It was released in the UK on March 2, 2015, and in the US on March 3. On February 18, the album was made available for instant download on the Polyvinyl Record Co. website, two weeks before its retail release date.

Reception 

Aureate Gloom received positive reviews from critics. On the review aggregate site Metacritic, the album has a score of 67 out of 100, indicating "generally favorable reviews".

Track listing

Personnel
of Montreal
Kevin Barnes – vocals, guitars
Clayton Rychlik – drums, percussion, clarinet, vocals
Jojo Glidewell – keys, synth
Bob Parins – bass, clarinet
Bennett Lewis – guitars
Kishi Bashi – strings, vocals

Production
 Drew Vandenberg – engineer, mixing
 Charles Godfrey – assistant engineer
 Greg Calbi – mastering

Artwork
 David Barnes – artwork
 Jerrod Landon Porter – layout, lettering

References

Of Montreal albums
Polyvinyl Record Co. albums
2015 albums
Albums recorded at Sonic Ranch